Slobodishche is a village in Orekhovo-Zuyevsky District of Moscow Oblast, Russia, located on the Guslitsa River (Nerskaya's tributary) some  south-east of Moscow.  Municipally, the village is a part of Ilyinskoye Rural Settlement (the administrative center of which is the village of Ilyinsky Pogost). Population: 327 (1997). Postal code: 142651.

Slobodishche was first mentioned in 1674.

The village is located in the historical area of Guslitsa (former Guslitskaya volost). An Old Believers' (Russian Orthodox Old-Rite Church) Our Lady of Kazan wooden church (built around 1881) is located in Slobodishche.

According to legend, all from Slobodishche were sorcerers.

External links 
Orekhovo-Zuyevo portal. Information about Slobodishche. 
 Михайлов С. С., Марков А. П. Старообрядцы Гуслиц. 

Rural localities in Moscow Oblast
Old Believer communities in Russia